Erzaldi Rosman Djohan has served as the Governor of Bangka-Belitung Islands, Indonesia, since 2017.

Note

See also
List of current provincial governors in Indonesia

Reference

Indonesian politicians